Isothecium is a genus of mosses belonging to the family Lembophyllaceae. The genus has a cosmopolitan distribution.

Species
The following species are recognised in the genus Isothecium:
 
Isothecium acuticuspis 
Isothecium algarvicum 
Isothecium alopecuroides 
Isothecium amoenum 
Isothecium andrieuxii 
Isothecium angustatum 
Isothecium arbuscula 
Isothecium beyrichii 
Isothecium bifarium 
Isothecium brachycladon 
Isothecium brewerianum 
Isothecium buchananii 
Isothecium catenulatum 
Isothecium ceylonense 
Isothecium cochlearifolium 
Isothecium comatum 
Isothecium comosum 
Isothecium compressum 
Isothecium crassiusculum 
Isothecium crispifolium 
Isothecium cristatum 
Isothecium cymbifolium 
Isothecium flexile 
Isothecium hakkodense 
Isothecium hexastichum 
Isothecium holtii 
Isothecium holzingeri 
Isothecium howei 
Isothecium imbricatum 
Isothecium intortum 
Isothecium intricatum 
Isothecium julaceum 
Isothecium kenyae 
Isothecium kerrii 
Isothecium laxifolium 
Isothecium lentum 
Isothecium leptochaeton 
Isothecium livens 
Isothecium longicuspis 
Isothecium marocanum 
Isothecium menziesii 
Isothecium mertensii 
Isothecium molle 
Isothecium mutabile 
Isothecium myosuroides 
Isothecium myuroides 
Isothecium neckeroides 
Isothecium nervosum 
Isothecium nigricans 
Isothecium obtusatulum 
Isothecium pallidum 
Isothecium patens 
Isothecium pendulum 
Isothecium pentastichum 
Isothecium philippeanum 
Isothecium physaophyllos 
Isothecium polyanthum 
Isothecium radiatum 
Isothecium radicans 
Isothecium repens 
Isothecium rigidissimum 
Isothecium rufescens 
Isothecium schleicheri 
Isothecium semitortum 
Isothecium sericeum 
Isothecium spiculiferum 
Isothecium sprucei 
Isothecium striatum 
Isothecium strictum 
Isothecium subdiversiforme 
Isothecium subglaciale 
Isothecium subseriatum 
Isothecium subsimplex 
Isothecium tenerum 
Isothecium tetragonum 
Isothecium thunbergii 
Isothecium trichocladon

References

Lembophyllaceae
Moss genera